Isla de la Luna (translation: "Island of the Moon") is an island in La Paz Department, Bolivia.  It is situated in Lake Titicaca, east of Isla del Sol ("Island of the Sun"). Legends in Inca mythology refer to the island as the location where Viracocha commanded the rising of the moon. Archeological ruins of an Inca nunnery were found on the eastern shore.

References

Lake islands of Bolivia
Islands of Lake Titicaca
Landforms of La Paz Department (Bolivia)